Rani Maharani is a 1990 Indian Kannada language film directed by B. Ramamurthy, starring  Malashri, Ambareesh and Shashikumar in lead roles. The supporting cast features Jaggesh, Umashree, Doddanna, Mysore Lokesh, Umesh, Tennis Krishna. The film is a remake of 1989 ChaalBaaz (1989). It was remade in 2010 by B. Ramamurthy, titled Na Rani Nee Maharani.

Plot synopsis
Rani and Maharani, twin sisters with opposite personality traits, get separated at a young age. Later when they cross paths, Rani finds out about Maharani's abusive family and decides to take Maharani's place to punish them.

Cast
 Malashri
 Ambareesh
 Shashikumar
 Umashree
 Doddanna
 Jaggesh
 Mysore Lokesh
 M. S. Umesh
 Tennis Krishna

Soundtrack

Hamsalekha composed the background score the film and the soundtracks and penning the lyrics for the soundtracks. The album has five soundtracks.

References

1990 films
1990s Kannada-language films
Twins in Indian films
Films scored by Hamsalekha
Kannada remakes of Hindi films
Films directed by B. Ramamurthy